Hilda Maria Lund (née Lindh, 21 December 18407 October 1911) was a Swedish ballerina at the Royal Swedish Ballet at the Royal Swedish Opera in Stockholm.

Lund was a ballet student in 1849, a second dancer in 1861 and elevated to a premier ballerina in 1866–1888. She performed the leading parts of many of the ballets staged at the royal opera in the 1870s and 1880s and was in 1887 described as "the acknowledged most distinguished female dancer of the royal opera".  She was an instructor at the ballet in 1889–1894.

She married her colleague, the ballet master Sigurd Harald Lund, in 1862.

References 

 Europas konstnärer 
 	Svenskt porträttgalleri / XXI. Tonkonstnärer och sceniska artister (biografier af Adolf Lindgren & Nils Personne)

1840 births
History of theatre
Swedish ballerinas
19th-century Swedish ballet dancers
1911 deaths
Royal Swedish Ballet dancers